The palmar intercarpal ligaments are fibrous bands that extend transversely across the palmar surfaces of the carpal bones, connecting adjacent carpals.  These are the ligaments that define the structure of the ligamentous palmar arch.

See also
 Palmar carpal ligament
 Pisohamate ligament
 Pisometacarpal ligament

External links
 

Upper limb anatomy
Ligaments